Luciosoma pellegrinii is a species of cyprinid fish endemic to northeastern and eastern Borneo.

References

Luciosoma
Danios
Fish described in 1905